Kang Zhenjie (Chinese: 康振捷; born 25 February 1993 in Hubei) is a Chinese football player who currently plays for China League One side Jiangxi Liansheng.

Club career
In 2013, Kang Zhenjie started his professional footballer career with Wuhan Zall in the Chinese Super League. He would eventually make his league debut for Wuhan on 3 November 2013 in a game against Guangzhou Evergrande.
On 4 March 2019, Kang was loaned to League Two side Jiangxi Liansheng for the 2019 season.

Career statistics 
Statistics accurate as of match played 31 December 2020.

Honours

Club
Wuhan Zall
China League One: 2018

References

External links
 

1993 births
Living people
Chinese footballers
Footballers from Hubei
Wuhan F.C. players
Jiangxi Beidamen F.C. players
Chinese Super League players
China League One players
China League Two players
Association football forwards